The Charlton County School District is a public school district in Charlton County, Georgia, United States, based in Folkston,. It serves the communities of Folkston, Homeland, Moniac, and Saint George.

Schools
The Charlton County School District has three elementary schools and one high school.

Elementary schools 
Bethune Middle School: Fourth Grade - Eighth Grade
Folkston Elementary School: Pre-Kindergarten - Third Grade
St. George Elementary School: Pre-Kindergarten - Sixth Grade

High school
Charlton County High School

References

External links

School districts in Georgia (U.S. state)
Education in Charlton County, Georgia